Heliangara is a genus of moths in the family Gelechiidae.

Species
 Heliangara ericydes Meyrick, 1916
 Heliangara lampetis Meyrick, 1906
 Heliangara macaritis Meyrick, 1910

References

Autostichinae